Crossness Nature Reserve is a 25.5 hectare local nature reserve in Crossness in the London Borough of Bexley. It is part of the Erith Marshes Site of Metropolitan Importance for Nature Conservation. The site is next to Crossness Sewage Works, and is owned and managed by Thames Water.

Crossness is part of the original Thames floodplain called Erith Marshes. It is one of the few remaining areas of grazing marsh in London, and it has the largest reedbeds in Bexley. It also has ponds and ditches, and areas of scrub and rough grassland. It is a major site for water voles, and 130 species of birds have been recorded, together with some rare invertebrates, including five species of water beetles. Scarce plants include knotted-hedge parsley and Borrer's saltmarsh grass.

There are footpaths through the eastern part of the site, accessed from Norman Road and Eastern Way, but the western part is closed to the public.

References

Local nature reserves in Greater London
Nature reserves in the London Borough of Bexley